Arnau Brugués-Davi was the defending champion but decided not to participate.
Illya Marchenko won the tournament by defeating Evgeny Donskoy 7–5, 6–3 in the final.

Seeds

Draw

Finals

Top half

Bottom half

References
 Main Draw
 Qualifying Draw

Penza Cup - Singles
2012 Singles
2012 in Russian tennis